This is a list of the Monitor Latino number-one songs of 2013. Chart rankings are based on airplay across radio stations in Mexico using the Radio Tracking Data, LLC in real time. Charts are ranked from Monday to Sunday.

Chart history
Besides the General chart, Monitor Latino published "Pop", "Regional" and "Anglo" charts. Monitor Latino provides two lists for each of these charts: the "Audience" list ranks the songs according to the estimated number of people that listened to them on the radio during the week.
The "Tocadas" (Spins) list ranks the songs according to the number of times they were played on the radio during the week.

General

Pop

Regional

English

See also
List of Top 100 songs for 2013 in Mexico
List of number-one albums of 2013 (Mexico)

References

2013
Number-one songs
Mexico